Evellius (died 66 AD) was an early Christian martyr. He was a counselor to Nero, but was eventually martyred at Pisa after he converted to Christianity.

Notes

66 deaths
1st-century Christian martyrs
Year of birth unknown